Michel Terrot (born December 18, 1948 in Lyon) is a member of the National Assembly of France.  He represents the Rhône department,  and is a member of the Union for a Popular Movement.

References

1948 births
Living people
Politicians from Lyon
Rally for the Republic politicians
Union for a Popular Movement politicians
Debout la France politicians
The Popular Right
Deputies of the 12th National Assembly of the French Fifth Republic
Deputies of the 13th National Assembly of the French Fifth Republic
Deputies of the 14th National Assembly of the French Fifth Republic